The 2021 Cholet-Pays de la Loire was the 43rd edition of the Cholet-Pays de la Loire road cycling one day race, which was held on 28 March 2021, starting and finishing in the French town of Cholet, in the Maine-et-Loire department. The race was a 1.1-rated event on the 2021 UCI Europe Tour and the second event of the 2021 French Road Cycling Cup.

The race was won in a sprint finish by Elia Viviani ahead of Jon Aberasturi and Pierre Barbier. Initially, Nacer Bouhanni finished third in the race, but he was first relegated and then disqualified following a dangerous sprint, during which he pushed Jake Stewart into the barriers, breaking Stewart's hand.

Teams 
Four UCI WorldTeams, eleven UCI ProTeams, and six UCI Continental teams made up the twenty-one teams that participated in the race. Four teams (and ) entered with seven riders, while all other teams entered with eight riders each. 143 of the 164 riders in the race finished.

UCI WorldTeams

 
 
 
 

UCI ProTeams

 
 
 
 
 
 
 
 
 
 
 

UCI Continental Teams

Results

References 

Cholet-Pays de la Loire
Cholet-Pays de la Loire
Cholet-Pays de la Loire
Cholet-Pays de la Loire